The 2014 Washington Nationals season was the Nationals' tenth season for the baseball franchise of Major League Baseball in the District of Columbia, the seventh season at Nationals Park, and the 46th since the original team was started in Montreal, Quebec, Canada. They finished the regular season with a record of 96–66, first place in the Eastern Division and with the best record in the entire National League. However, they lost to the eventual World Series champion San Francisco Giants in the National League Division Series in four games.

Offseason
On October 31, 2013, the Nationals signed Matt Williams, previously the third base coach for the Arizona Diamondbacks, as the new manager, replacing the retiring Davey Johnson. On November 25, 2013, they traded Fernando Abad to the Oakland Athletics for minor-leaguer John Wooten. They also traded relief pitcher Ian Krol and utility infielder Steve Lombardozzi Jr., along with pitching prospect Robbie Ray, to the Detroit Tigers for starting pitcher Doug Fister on December 2, 2013, and acquired relief pitcher Jerry Blevins from the Oakland Athletics on December 11. The next day brought the signing of veteran outfielder Nate McLouth from the Baltimore Orioles, and on December 19, 2013, the Nationals sold Corey Brown to Oakland. On February 13, 2014, the Nationals traded Nathan Karns to the Tampa Bay Rays  in exchange for José Lobatón, Felipe Rivero and Drew Vettleson. On March 14, 2014, Washington traded Koyie Hill to the Philadelphia Phillies for a player to be named later or cash, and the following day the Nationals received Brandon Laird from the Kansas City Royals for a player to be named later or cash.

Spring training

Spring training
The Nationals held their 2014 spring training in Viera, Florida, with home games played at Space Coast Stadium.

The Nationals finished their spring training schedule with a 15–13 record, good for sixth in the Grapefruit League. Among projected starters, catcher Wilson Ramos led the team with a .385 batting average, driving in 13 runs. Young infielder Zach Walters hit at a .379 clip in 29 AB in his quest to make the Opening Day roster. In the battle for the position of Opening Day second baseman, Anthony Rendon had 13 H, 6 RBI, and a .289 average, while Danny Espinosa hit only .226 in 53 AB.

For the most part, the pitchers were solid throughout the spring, posting a 3.68 ERA and allowing only 11 HR (compared with the 28 hit by the Nationals). 2013 Cy Young candidate Jordan Zimmermann was dominant, compiling a 0.50 ERA with 15 strikeouts in 18 innings pitched. Rafael Soriano, however, had an extremely rough spring, as he finished with a 14.29 ERA. The Nationals, though, are still confident with him as their closer to start the season. Newly acquired left-handed reliever Jerry Blevins impressed with only 3 hits allowed in 9.1 innings pitched. Doug Fister, acquired in an offseason trade with the Detroit Tigers was only able to get through 5.1 innings this spring, struggling with inflammation in his elbow and a strained lateral muscle.

Team News

On March 19, the Nationals announced that for the third straight season, Stephen Strasburg would be the Opening Day starting pitcher. They opened on the road against the New York Mets on March 31. The Nationals home opener was April 4 against the Atlanta Braves.

Regular season

Opening Day
On March 31, the Nationals began the regular season at Citi Field against the New York Mets, winning 9–7 in 10 innings. The score was tied 5–5 at the end of 9 innings, but in the top of the 10th Ian Desmond hit a sacrifice fly to score Jayson Werth, and Anthony Rendon hit a 3-run home run. The Mets rallied in the bottom of the 10th with a 2-run home run by David Wright, but were unable to catch up completely. The winning pitcher was Nationals reliever Aaron Barrett, who made his Major League debut with a perfect 9th inning, striking out two Mets. The losing pitcher was Mets reliever Jeurys Familia, who surrendered the sacrifice fly to Desmond.

During the game, catcher Wilson Ramos suffered an injury to his left hand and was removed in the 7th inning, replaced by José Lobatón. Later tests revealed that he had broken the hamate bone and was expected to be on the disabled list for 4–6 weeks.

April
Completing their opening series in New York on April 2 and 3, the Nationals swept the Mets to begin the season 3–0, accomplishing the feat despite the Ramos injury and a late scratch of starting pitcher Jordan Zimmermann (due to flu-like symptoms) before the third game of the series. Zimmermann was replaced by Tanner Roark, who was originally scheduled to pitch the following day. Much of the victory was due to the weakness of the Mets bullpen, who combined to surrender 12 of the 22 runs the Nats scored in the series.

The Nationals home opener was on Friday, April 4 against the Atlanta Braves, who went 13–6 against the Nats in the 2013 season. Although they lost that game and the one the next day, the Nationals won the third game of the series and then proceeded to sweep the next series against the Miami Marlins to finish their first homestand 4–2 (7–2 overall). During that homestand, the team suffered from two health issues. Ryan Zimmerman left the April 5 game early with a sore throwing shoulder later described by manager Matt Williams as degenerative, but adjusted his throwing motion and returned to the starting lineup in the April 9 game. Meanwhile, Scott Hairston went on the 15-day disabled list with a left oblique strain and was replaced by Tyler Moore.

The Nationals then traveled to Atlanta to face the Braves again on April 11–13, followed by a trip to Miami on April 14–16. They lost the first two games of the road trip, and suffered additional injuries. On the 11th, Denard Span collided with Braves second baseman Dan Uggla on the basepaths and was subsequently put on the 7-day concussion disabled list. The Nats called up outfielder Steven Souza to replace Span and, concerned about overworking the bullpen, optioned Aaron Barrett to the AAA Syracuse Chiefs and called up reliever Blake Treinen. The next day, Ryan Zimmerman got picked off second base and broke his thumb diving back into the bag. Zimmerman is expected to be out 4–6 weeks. The Nats placed Zimmerman on the 15-day disabled list and called up infielder Zach Walters in response. The Braves completed the sweep the next day. The Nationals took two games out of three in Miami before returning home.

In the next homestand, the Nationals hosted four games against the St. Louis Cardinals on April 17–20, three against the Los Angeles Angels of Anaheim on April 21–23, and four against the San Diego Padres on April 24–27. They split the series with the Cardinals, two games apiece. On the 18th, they optioned Treinen back to AAA Syracuse and called up left-hander Xavier Cedeño, citing a desire to give Treinen time to work up to being a starting pitcher, and on the 19th they reinstated Denard Span from the 7-day concussion disabled list, optioning Souza back to Syracuse. The 3-game series against the Angels was their first interleague series of 2014. The Nationals lost the first two games of the series, especially notable because in the game on April 22, the Angels' Albert Pujols hit his 499th and 500th career home runs off of starter Taylor Jordan, becoming the twenty-sixth member of the 500 home run club. The Nats did avoid the sweep with a four-run walk-off rally in the bottom of the ninth inning on April 23. They went on to split the series with the Padres, but Bryce Harper injured his left thumb on April 25; the injury was initially believed to be a jammed thumb, but was later reevaluated as a sprain, forcing the Nationals to put Harper on the 15-day disabled list and again call up Steven Souza from AAA Syracuse. The game of April 26 was notable for Nationals starter Tanner Roark pitching his first career complete game shutout.

The Nationals finished the month of April with a road trip to play two games against the Houston Astros in interleague play on April 29–30. Before the series, it was announced that Harper's thumb injury was even more serious than previously reported, requiring surgery and sidelining him for at least two months. The Nationals also optioned starter Taylor Jordan to AAA Syracuse, calling up right-handed reliever Ryan Mattheus; the Nats had sufficient off-days that they believed they could go with a four-man rotation until Doug Fister's projected return on May 6. The Nationals then proceeded to sweep the short series against the Astros, and Jordan Zimmermann won his 45th game as a National, surpassing Liván Hernández for the club record since the team moved from Montreal in 2005.

June

Although at 5 hours 22 minutes not the longest Nationals game in terms of time elapsed, the 16-inning game on June 24, 2014, against the Milwaukee Brewers at Miller Park in Milwaukee was the longest game in Nationals history at the time in terms of the number of innings played.

August
After a 1–0 win against the Arizona Diamondbacks in Nationals Park, Washington's winning streak extended to 10. Of those 10 victories, seven were by one run and six were walk-off wins.

September
Washington defeated the Los Angeles Dodgers, 8–5, in a 14-inning game on September 3 that lasted 5 hours 34 minutes – the longest game in Nationals history at the time in terms of time elapsed.

On September 16, the Nationals defeated the Atlanta Braves, 3-0, in Atlanta to clinch the National League East Division for the second time in three years. On September 26, in the first game of a doubleheader at Nationals Park, the Nationals defeated the Miami Marlins 4-0 and clinched the best record in the National League, also for the second time in three years.

On September 28, in the final game of the regular season, Jordan Zimmermann threw the first no-hitter in Nationals history in a 1-0 victory over the Marlins at Nationals Park. It was the fifth no-hitter in the history of the franchise since it began play in Montreal in 1969, and the first since Dennis Martínez pitched a perfect game for the Montreal Expos on July 28, 1991 against the Los Angeles Dodgers. It was also the first no-hitter for a Washington major-league baseball pitcher since Bobby Burke of the original Washington Senators pitched one against the Boston Red Sox in a game at Griffith Stadium on August 8, 1931, and only the third in history for a Washington major-league team. It was also only the fifth no-hitter in major-league baseball history pitched in the last game of the regular season; coincidentally, the last time it had happened was when Henderson Álvarez, the starting pitcher for Miami in Zimmermanns no-hitter, pitched one against the Detroit Tigers on September 29, 2013, in Miamis final game of the previous season.

In the third inning of the September 28 game, center fielder Denard Span doubled to set a single-season record for hits by a Washington Nationals player with his 184th hit of the season.

Season standings

National League East

National League Wild Card

Record vs. opponents

Opening Day lineup

Notable transactions
July 1, 2014: The Nationals sold minor-leaguer Brock Peterson to the Los Angeles Dodgers.
July 31, 2014: The Nationals traded Zach Walters to the Cleveland Indians for Asdrúbal Cabrera and cash.

Major league debuts
Aaron Barrett (March 31, 2014)
Taylor Hill (June 25, 2014)
Steven Souza Jr. (April 13, 2014)
Michael A. Taylor (August 12, 2014)
Blake Treinen (April 12, 2014)

Attendance
The Nationals drew 2,579,389 fans at Nationals Park during the regular season in 2014, their third-highest attendance since arriving in Washington in 2005. It placed them seventh in attendance for the season among the 15 National League teams. Their highest attendance at a home game was on April 4, when they drew 42,834 for their home opener against the Atlanta Braves, while their lowest was 20,869 for a game against the Miami Marlins on April 10. Their average home attendance was 31,844 per game, third-highest since their arrival in Washington.

Game log

|-align="center" bgcolor="bbffbb"
| 1 || March 31 || @ Mets || 9–7 (10) || Barrett (1–0) || Familia (0–1) || || 42,442 || 1–0
|-

|-align="center" bgcolor="bbffbb"
| 2 || April 2 || @ Mets || 5–1 || González (1–0) || Colón (0–1) || || 29,146 || 2–0
|-align="center" bgcolor="bbffbb"
| 3 || April 3 || @ Mets || 8–2 || Roark (1–0) || Wheeler (0–1) || || 20,561 || 3–0
|-align="center" bgcolor="ffbbbb"
| 4 || April 4 || Braves || 2–1 || Avilán (1–0) || Clippard (0–1) || Kimbrel (3) || 42,834 || 3–1
|-align="center" bgcolor="ffbbbb"
| 5 || April 5 || Braves || 6–2 || Teherán (1–1) || Strasburg (0–1) || || 37,841 || 3–2
|-align="center" bgcolor="bbffbb"
| 6 || April 6 || Braves || 2–1 || Blevins (1–0) || Wood (1–1) || Soriano (1) || 34,327 || 4–2
|-align="center" bgcolor="bbffbb"
| 7 || April 8 || Marlins || 5–0 || González (2–0) || Álvarez (0–2) || || 21,728 || 5–2
|-align="center" bgcolor="bbffbb"
| 8 || April 9 || Marlins || 10–7 || Clippard (1–1) || Mármol (0–1) || Soriano (2) || 21,190 || 6–2
|-align="center" bgcolor="bbffbb"
| 9 || April 10 || Marlins || 7–1 || Strasburg (1–1) || Koehler (1–1) || || 20,869 || 7–2
|-align="center" bgcolor="ffbbbb"
| 10 || April 11 || @ Braves || 7–6 (10) || Avilán (2–1) || Blevins (1–1) || || 28,243 || 7–3
|-align="center" bgcolor="ffbbbb"
| 11 || April 12 || @ Braves || 6–3 || Wood (2–1) || Jordan (0–1) || Kimbrel (5) || 36,621 || 7–4
|-align="center" bgcolor="ffbbbb"
| 12 || April 13 || @ Braves || 10–2 || Harang (2–1) || González (2–1) || || 27,919 || 7–5
|-align="center" bgcolor="bbffbb"
| 13 || April 14 || @ Marlins || 9–2 || Zimmermann (1–0) || Hand (0–1) || || 18,788 || 8–5
|-align="center" bgcolor="ffbbbb"
| 14 || April 15 || @ Marlins || 11–2 || Koehler (2–1) || Strasburg (1–2) || || 19,931 || 8–6
|-align="center" bgcolor="bbffbb"
| 15 || April 16 || @ Marlins || 6–3 || Storen (1–0) || Dunn (0–2) || Soriano (3) || 20,178 || 9–6
|-align="center" bgcolor="ffbbbb"
| 16 || April 17 || Cardinals || 8–0 || Wainwright (3–1) || Jordan (0–2) || || 28,987 || 9–7
|-align="center" bgcolor="bbffbb"
| 17 || April 18 || Cardinals || 3–1 || González (3–1) || Wacha (2–1) || Soriano (4) || 31,237 || 10–7
|-align="center" bgcolor="ffbbbb"
| 18 || April 19 || Cardinals || 4–3 || Lynn (4–0) || Zimmermann (1–1) || Rosenthal (5) || 41,084 || 10–8
|-align="center" bgcolor="bbffbb"
| 19 || April 20 || Cardinals || 3–2 || Soriano (1–0) || Maness (0–1) || || 27,653 || 11–8
|-align="center" bgcolor="ffbbbb"
| 20 || April 21 || Angels || 4–2 || Salas (1–0) || Clippard (1–2) || Frieri (2) || 24,371 || 11–9
|-align="center" bgcolor="ffbbbb"
| 21 || April 22 || Angels || 7–2 || Skaggs (2–0) || Jordan (0–3) || || 21,915 || 11–10
|-align="center" bgcolor="bbffbb"
| 22 || April 23 || Angels || 5–4 || Storen (2–0) || Frieri (0–2) || || 22,504 || 12–10
|-align="center" bgcolor="ffbbbb"
| 23 || April 24 || Padres || 4–3 (12) || Torres (1–0) || Stammen (0–1) || Street (8) || 22,904 || 12–11
|-align="center" bgcolor="bbffbb"
| 24 || April 25 || Padres || 11–1 || Strasburg (2–2) || Erlin (1–3) || || 25,497 || 13–11
|-align="center" bgcolor="bbffbb"
| 25 || April 26 || Padres || 4–0 || Roark (2–0) || Cashner (2–3) || || 31,590 || 14–11
|-align="center" bgcolor="ffbbbb"
| 26 || April 27 || Padres || 4–2 || Kennedy (2–3) || Detwiler (0–1) || Street (9) || 34,873 || 14–12
|-align="center" bgcolor="bbffbb"
| 27 || April 29 || @ Astros || 4–3 || Clippard (2–2) || Fields (0–3) || Soriano (5) || 23,394 || 15–12
|-align="center" bgcolor="bbffbb"
| 28 || April 30 || @ Astros || 7–0 || Zimmermann (2–1) || Oberholtzer (0–5) || || 25,172 || 16–12
|-

|-align="center" bgcolor="bbffbb"
| 29 || May 2 || @ Phillies || 5–3 || Blevins (2–1) || Adams (1–1) || Soriano (6) || 31,945 || 17–12
|-align="center" bgcolor="ffbbbb"
| 30 || May 3 || @ Phillies || 7–2 || Burnett (2–1) || Roark (2–1) || || 33,441 || 17–13
|-align="center" bgcolor="ffbbbb"
| 31 || May 4 || @ Phillies || 1–0 || Hernández (2–1) || González (3–2) || Papelbon (9) || 37,490 || 17–14
|-align="center" bgcolor="bbffbb"
| 32 || May 5 || Dodgers || 4–0 || Barrett (2–0) || Greinke (5–1) || || 25,447 || 18–14
|-align="center" bgcolor="ffbbbb"
| 33 || May 6 || Dodgers || 8–3 || Kershaw (2–0) || Treinen (0–1) || || 30,143 || 18–15
|-align="center" bgcolor="bbffbb"
| 34 || May 7 || Dodgers || 3–2 || Strasburg (3–2) || Haren (4–1) || Soriano (7) || 34,756 || 19–15
|-align="center" bgcolor="ffbbbb"
| 35 || May 9 || @ Athletics || 8–0 || Milone (1–3) || Fister (0–1) || || 20,159 || 19–16
|-align="center" bgcolor="ffbbbb"
| 36 || May 10 || @ Athletics || 4–3 (10) || Doolittle (1–2) || Storen (2–1) || || 36,067 || 19–17
|-align="center" bgcolor="ffbbbb"
| 37 || May 11 || @ Athletics || 9–1 || Kazmir (5–1) || González (3–3) || || 28,205 || 19–18
|-align="center" bgcolor="bbffbb"
| 38 || May 12 || @ Diamondbacks || 6–5 || Clippard (3–2) || Reed (1–3) || Soriano (8) || 16,555 || 20–18
|-align="center" bgcolor="ffbbbb"
| 39 || May 13 || @ Diamondbacks || 3–1 || Arroyo (4–2) || Strasburg (3–3) || || 19,025 || 20–19
|-align="center" bgcolor="bbffbb"
| 40 || May 14 || @ Diamondbacks || 5–1 || Clippard (4–2) || Ziegler (0–1) || || 18,325 || 21–19
|-align="center" bgcolor="bbffbb"
| 41 || May 16 || Mets || 5–2 || Roark (3–1) || Niese (2–3) || Soriano (9) || 34,413 || 22–19
|-align="center" bgcolor="ffbbbb"
| 42 || May 17 || Mets || 5–2 || Colón (3–5) || González (3–4) || Mejía (1) || 41,225 || 22–20
|-align="center" bgcolor="bbffbb"
| 43 || May 18 || Mets || 6–3 || Zimmermann (3–1) || Wheeler (1–4) || Soriano (10) || 36,965 || 23–20
|-align="center" bgcolor="ffbbbb"
| 44 || May 19 || Reds || 4–3 (15) || Ondrusek (1–2) || Detwiler (0–2) || || 24,505 || 23–21
|-align="center" bgcolor="bbffbb"
| 45 || May 20 || Reds || 9–4 || Fister (1–1) || Cueto (4–3) || || 26,455 || 24–21
|-align="center" bgcolor="ffbbbb"
| 46 || May 21 || Reds || 2–1 || Simón (6–2) || Roark (3–2) || Chapman (3) || 28,944 || 24–22
|-align="center" bgcolor="ffbbbb"
| 47 || May 22 || @ Pirates || 3–1 || Vólquez (2–4) || Treinen (0–2) || Melançon (8) || 23,468 || 24–23
|-align="center" bgcolor="ffbbbb"
| 48 || May 23 || @ Pirates || 4–3 || Morton (1–6) || Zimmermann (3–2) || Grilli (5) || 31,592 || 24–24
|-align="center" bgcolor="ffbbbb"
| 49 || May 24 || @ Pirates || 3–2 || Hughes (3–1) || Strasburg (3–4) || Melançon (9) || 38,889 || 24–25
|-align="center" bgcolor="bbffbb"
| 50 || May 25 || @ Pirates || 5–2 || Fister (2–1) || Liriano (0–5) || Soriano (11) || 38,047 || 25–25
|-align="center" bgcolor="ffbbbb"
| 51 || May 26 || Marlins || 3–2 || Eovaldi (4–2) || Roark (3–3) || Cishek (11) || 33,677 || 25–26
|-align="center" bgcolor="bbbbbb"
|–|| May 27 || Marlins || colspan=6| Postponed (rain) Rescheduled for September 26 as part of a doubleheader
|-align="center" bgcolor="ffbbbb"
| 52 || May 28 || Marlins || 8–5 (10) || Slowey (1–0) || Blevins (2–2) || || 24,830 || 25–27
|-align="center" bgcolor="bbffbb"
| 53 || May 30 || Rangers || 9–2 || Strasburg (4–4) || Lewis (4–4) || || 31,659 || 26–27
|-align="center" bgcolor="bbffbb"
| 54 || May 31 || Rangers || 10–2 || Fister (3–1) || Tepesch (2–1) || || 35,164 || 27–27
|-

|-align="center" bgcolor="ffbbbb"
| 55 || June 1 || Rangers || 2–0 || Darvish (5–2) || Roark (3–4) || Soria (11) || 32,813 || 27–28
|-align="center" bgcolor="bbffbb"
| 56 || June 3 || Phillies || 7–0 || Zimmermann (4–2) || Buchanan (1–2) || || 25,291 || 28–28
|-align="center" bgcolor="bbffbb"
| 57 || June 4 || Phillies || 8–4 || Strasburg (5–4) || Burnett (3–5) || || 33,614 || 29–28
|-align="center" bgcolor="bbffbb"
| 58 || June 5 || Phillies || 4–2 || Fister (4–1) || Kendrick (1–6) || Soriano (12) || 33,016 || 30–28
|-align="center" bgcolor="bbffbb"
| 59 || June 6 || @ Padres || 6–0 || Roark (4–4) || Ross (6–5) || || 25,346 || 31–28
|-align="center" bgcolor="ffbbbb"
| 60 || June 7 || @ Padres || 4–3 (11) || Benoit (2–0) || Stammen (0–2) || || 29,172 || 31–29
|-align="center" bgcolor="bbffbb"
| 61 || June 8 || @ Padres || 6–0 || Zimmermann (5–2) || Stults (2–7) || || 27,046 || 32–29
|-align="center" bgcolor="bbffbb"
| 62 || June 9 || @ Giants || 9–2 || Strasburg (6–4) || Vogelsong (4–3) || || 41,597 || 33–29
|-align="center" bgcolor="bbffbb"
| 63 || June 10 || @ Giants || 2–1 || Fister (5–1) || Bumgarner (8–4) || Soriano (13) || 41,545 || 34–29
|-align="center" bgcolor="bbffbb"
| 64 || June 11 || @ Giants || 6–2 || Roark (5–4) || Cain (1–4) || || 41,404 || 35–29
|-align="center" bgcolor="ffbbbb"
| 65 || June 12 || @ Giants || 7–1 || Hudson (7–2) || Treinen (0–3) || || 41,067 || 35–30
|-align="center" bgcolor="ffbbbb"
| 66 || June 13 || @ Cardinals || 1–0 || Lynn (7–4) || Zimmermann (5–3) || Rosenthal (18) || 41,519 || 35–31
|-align="center" bgcolor="ffbbbb"
| 67 || June 14 || @ Cardinals || 4–1 || Choate (1–2) || Strasburg (6–5) || Rosenthal (19) || 44,785 || 35–32
|-align="center" bgcolor="ffbbbb"
| 68 || June 15 || @ Cardinals || 5–2 || García (3–0) || Fister (5–2) || Rosenthal (20) || 45,325 || 35–33
|-align="center" bgcolor="bbffbb"
| 69 || June 17 || Astros || 6–5 || Roark (6–4) || Keuchel (8–4) || Soriano (14) || 29,960 || 36–33
|-align="center" bgcolor="bbffbb"
| 70 || June 18 || Astros || 6–5 || Barrett (3–0) || Downs (1–1) || Soriano (15) || 25,453 || 37–33
|-align="center" bgcolor="ffbbbb"
| 71 || June 19 || Braves || 3–0 || Floyd (2–2) || Zimmermann (5–4) || Kimbrel (21) || 32,193 || 37–34
|-align="center" bgcolor="ffbbbb"
| 72 || June 20 || Braves || 6–4 (13) || Buchter (1–0) || Blevins (2–3) || Walden (2) || 36,608 || 37–35
|-align="center" bgcolor="bbffbb"
| 73 || June 21 || Braves || 3–0 || Fister (6–2) || Teherán (6–5) || Soriano (16) || 40,677 || 38–35
|-align="center" bgcolor="bbffbb"
| 74 || June 22 || Braves || 4–1 || Roark (7–4) || Santana (5–5) || Soriano (17) || 39,473 || 39–35
|-align="center" bgcolor="bbffbb"
| 75 || June 23 || @ Brewers || 3–0 || González (4–4) || Garza (4–5) || Clippard (1) || 31,102 || 40–35
|-align="center" bgcolor="bbffbb"
| 76 || June 24 || @ Brewers || 4–2 (16) || Clippard (5–2) || Fiers (0–1) || Soriano (18) || 30,149 || 41–35
|-align="center" bgcolor="ffbbbb"
| 77 || June 25 || @ Brewers || 9–2 || Estrada (7–4) || Strasburg (6–6) || || 39,049 || 41–36
|-align="center" bgcolor="ffbbbb"
| 78 || June 26 || @ Cubs || 5–3 || Ramirez (1–1) || Stammen (0–3) || Rondón (9) || 28,867 || 41–37
|-align="center" bgcolor="ffbbbb"
| 79 || June 27 || @ Cubs || 7–2 || Hammel (7–5) || Roark (7–5) ||  || 30,683 || 41–38
|-align="center" bgcolor="bbffbb"
| 80 || June 28 (1) || @ Cubs || 3–0 || González (5–4) || Beeler (0–1) || Soriano (19) || 35,770 || 42–38
|-align="center" bgcolor="bbffbb"
| 81 || June 28 (2) || @ Cubs || 7–2 || Treinen (1–3) || Samardzija (2–7) || Detwiler (1) || 32,267 || 43–38
|-align="center" bgcolor="bbffbb"
| 82 || June 30 || Rockies || 7–3 || Zimmermann (6–4) || Flande (0–1) || || 33,660 || 44–38
|-

|-align="center" bgcolor="bbffbb"
| 83 || July 1 || Rockies || 7–1 || Strasburg (7–6) || Friedrich (0–3) || || 26,033 || 45–38
|-align="center" bgcolor="bbffbb"
| 84 || July 2 || Rockies || 4–3 || Fister (7–2) || Belisle (2–4) || Soriano (20) || 28,943 || 46–38
|-align="center" bgcolor="ffbbbb"
| 85 || July 4 || Cubs || 7–2 || Hammel (8–5) || Roark (7–6) || || 41,274 || 46–39
|-align="center" bgcolor="bbffbb"
| 86 || July 5 || Cubs || 13–0 || González (6–4) || Villanueva (4–6) || || 38,473 || 47–39
|-align="center" bgcolor="bbffbb"
| 87 || July 6 || Cubs || 2–1 || Clippard (6–2) || Strop (1–4) || Soriano (21) || 32,941 || 48–39
|-align="center" bgcolor="ffbbbb"
| 88 || July 7 || Orioles || 8–2 (11) || McFarland (2–2) || Stammen (0–4) || || 35,126 || 48–40
|-align="center" bgcolor="bbbbbb"
|–|| July 8 || Orioles || colspan=6| Postponed (rain) Rescheduled for August 4
|-align="center" bgcolor="bbffbb"
| 89 || July 9 || @ Orioles || 6–2 || Fister (8–2) || Norris (7–6) || || 35,575 || 49–40
|-align="center" bgcolor="ffbbbb"
| 90 || July 10 || @ Orioles || 4–3|| Chen (9–3) || González (6–5) || Britton (15) || 30,417 || 49–41
|-align="center" bgcolor="ffbbbb"
| 91 || July 11 || @ Phillies || 6–2 || Burnett (6–8) || Zimmermann (6–5) || || 30,094 || 49–42
|-align="center" bgcolor="bbffbb"
| 92 || July 12 || @ Phillies || 5–3 (10) || Detwiler (1–2) || Diekman (3–3) || Soriano (22) || 32,072 || 50–42
|-align="center" bgcolor="bbffbb"
| 93 || July 13 || @ Phillies || 10–3 || Roark (8–6) || Kendrick (4–9) || || 30,185 || 51–42
|- style="text-align:center; background:#bbb;"
|colspan=9| All–Star Break (July 14–17)
|-align="center" bgcolor="ffbbbb"
| 94 || July 18 || Brewers || 4–2 || Lohse (10–4) || Strasburg (7–7) || Rodríguez (28) || 39,373 || 51–43
|-align="center" bgcolor="bbffbb"
| 95 || July 19 || Brewers || 8–3 || Roark (9–6) || Garza (6–7) || || 38,649 || 52–43
|-align="center" bgcolor="bbffbb"
| 96 || July 20 || Brewers || 5–4 || Soriano (2–0) || Wooten (1–4) ||  || 36,373 || 53–43
|-align="center" bgcolor="bbffbb"
| 97 || July 21 || @ Rockies || 7–2 || Fister (9–2) || Morales (5–5) ||  || 33,082 || 54–43
|-align="center" bgcolor="bbffbb"
| 98 || July 22 || @ Rockies || 7–4 || Stammen (1–4) || Brown (0–1) || Soriano (23) || 36,874  || 55–43
|-align="center" bgcolor="ffbbbb"
| 99 || July 23 || @ Rockies || 6–4 || de la Rosa (11–6) || Strasburg (7–8) || || 30,728 || 55–44
|-align="center" bgcolor="bbffbb"
| 100 || July 25 || @ Reds || 4–1 || Roark (10–6) || Simón (12–5) || Soriano (24) || 38,812 || 56–44
|-align="center" bgcolor="ffbbbb"
| 101 || July 26 || @ Reds || 1–0 || Cueto (11–6) || González (6–6) || Chapman (22) || 32,999 || 56–45
|-align="center" bgcolor="bbffbb"
| 102 || July 27 || @ Reds || 4–2 || Fister (10–2) || Latos (2–3) || Soriano (25) || 31,982 || 57–45
|-align="center" bgcolor="ffbbbb"
| 103 || July 28 || @ Marlins || 7–6 || Dunn (8–5) || Soriano (2–1) || || 20,027 || 57–46
|-align="center" bgcolor="ffbbbb"
| 104 || July 29 || @ Marlins || 3–0 || Álvarez (8–5) || Strasburg (7–9) || Cishek (27) || 22,672 || 57–47
|-align="center" bgcolor="bbffbb"
| 105 || July 30 || @ Marlins || 4–3 || Roark (11–6) || Hand (2–3) || Storen (1) || 26,319 || 58–47
|-align="center" bgcolor="ffbbbb"
| 106 || July 31 || Phillies || 10–4 || Bastardo (5–4) || González (6–7) ||  || 35,722 || 58–48
|-

|-align="center" bgcolor="ffbbbb"
| 107 || August 1 || Phillies || 2–1 || Hernández (6–8) || Fister (10–3) || Papelbon (26) || 28,410  || 58–49
|-align="center" bgcolor="bbffbb"
| 108 || August 2 || Phillies || 11–0 || Zimmermann (7–5) || Burnett (6–11) || || 36,155 || 59–49
|-align="center" bgcolor="bbffbb"
| 109 || August 3 || Phillies  || 4–0 || Strasburg (8–9) || Hamels (6–6) || || 30,038 || 60–49
|-align="center" bgcolor="ffbbbb"
| 110 || August 4 || Orioles || 7–3 || Gausman (6–3) || Roark (11–7) || || 42,181 || 60–50
|-align="center" bgcolor="ffbbbb"
| 111 || August 5 || Mets || 6–1 || Wheeler (7–8) || González (6–8) || || 40,686 || 60–51
|-align="center" bgcolor="bbffbb"
| 112 || August 6 || Mets || 7–1 || Fister (11–3) || Niese (5–8) || || 26,701  || 61–51
|-align="center" bgcolor="bbffbb"
| 113 || August 7 || Mets || 5–3 (13) || Stammen (2–4) || Torres (5–5) || || 38,611  || 62–51
|-align="center" bgcolor="ffbbbb"
| 114 || August 8 || @ Braves || 7–6 || Santana (11–6) || Strasburg (8–10) || Kimbrel (33) || 32,707 || 62–52
|-align="center" bgcolor="bbffbb"
| 115 || August 9 || @ Braves || 4–1 (11) || Clippard (7–2) || Carpenter (4–2) || Soriano (26) || 36,832 || 63–52
|-align="center" bgcolor="ffbbbb"
| 116 || August 10 || @ Braves || 3–1  || Wood (8–9) || González (6–9)  || Kimbrel (34) || 18,191 || 63–53
|-align="center" bgcolor="bbffbb"
| 117 || August 12 || @ Mets || 7–1  || Fister (12–3) || Montero (0–3)  || || 21,200 || 64–53
|-align="center" bgcolor="bbffbb"
| 118 || August 13 || @ Mets || 3–2  || Zimmermann (8–5) || Colón (11–10)  || Soriano (27) || 21,364   || 65–53
|-align="center" bgcolor="bbffbb"
| 119 || August 14 || @ Mets || 4–1  || Strasburg (9–10) || Gee (4–5)  || Soriano (28) || 22,782   || 66–53
|-align="center" bgcolor="bbffbb"
| 120 || August 15 || Pirates || 5–4  || Roark (12–7) || Morton (5–12)  || Soriano (29) || 36,945 || 67–53
|-align="center" bgcolor="bbffbb"
| 121 || August 16 || Pirates || 4–3  || Thornton (1–0) || Wilson (3–3)  || || 41,880 || 68–53
|-align="center" bgcolor="bbffbb"
| 122 || August 17 || Pirates || 6–5 (11) || Detwiler (2–2) || Cumpton (3–4) ||  || 34,430 || 69–53
|-align="center" bgcolor="bbffbb"
| 123 || August 18 || Diamondbacks || 5–4 (11) || Stammen (3–4) || Harris (0–3) ||  || 21,292 || 70–53
|-align="center" bgcolor="bbffbb"
| 124 || August 19 || Diamondbacks || 8–1 || Strasburg (10–10) || Anderson (7–5) ||  || 26,827 || 71–53
|-align="center" bgcolor="bbffbb"
| 125 || August 20 || Diamondbacks || 3–2 || Soriano (3–1) || Marshall (4–3) ||  || 24,113 || 72–53
|-align="center" bgcolor="bbffbb"
| 126 || August 21 || Diamondbacks || 1–0 || Soriano (4–1) || Pérez (2–3) ||  || 32,311 || 73–53
|-align="center" bgcolor="ffbbbb"
| 127 || August 22 || Giants || 10–3 || Hudson (9–9) || Fister (12–4) ||  || 33,718 || 73–54
|-align="center" bgcolor="bbffbb"
| 128 || August 23 || Giants || 6–2 || Zimmermann (9–5) || Lincecum (10–9) ||  || 34,137 || 74–54
|-align="center" bgcolor="bbffbb"
| 129 || August 24 || Giants || 14–6 || Stammen (4–4) || Affeldt (3–2) ||  || 35,476 || 75–54
|-align="center" bgcolor="ffbbbb"
| 130 || August 25 || @ Phillies || 3–2 || Burnett (7–14) || Roark (12–8) || Papelbon (32) ||  23,089 || 75–55
|-align="center" bgcolor="ffbbbb"
| 131 || August 26 || @ Phillies || 4–3 || Giles (3–1) || Clippard (7–3) || Papelbon (33) || 25,238  || 75–56
|-align="center" bgcolor="ffbbbb"
| 132 || August 27 || @ Phillies || 8–4 || Kendrick (7–11) || Fister (12–5) || || 33,183 || 75–57
|-align="center" bgcolor="bbffbb"
| 133 || August 29 || @ Mariners || 8–3 || Zimmermann (10–5) || Hernández (13–5) || || 35,616 || 76–57
|-align="center" bgcolor="bbffbb"
| 134 || August 30 || @ Mariners || 3–1 || Strasburg (11–10) || Elías (9–12) ||  Soriano (30)|| 32,894 || 77–57
|-align="center" bgcolor="ffbbbb"
| 135 || August 31 || @ Mariners || 5–3 || Iwakuma (13–6) || Roark (12–9) || Rodney (39) || 26,221 || 77–58
|-

|-align="center" bgcolor="bbffbb"
| 136 || September 1 || @ Dodgers || 6–4 ||  González (7–9) || Hernández (8–10) ||  Soriano (31)|| 41,857 || 78–58
|-align="center" bgcolor="ffbbbb"
| 137 || September 2 || @ Dodgers || 4–1 ||  Kershaw (17–3) || Fister (12–6) ||  Jansen (39)|| 43,352 || 78–59
|-align="center" bgcolor="bbffbb"
| 138 || September 3 || @ Dodgers || 8–5 (14) ||  Treinen (2–3) || Correia (2–3) ||  || 38,404  || 79–59
|-align="center" bgcolor="ffbbbb"
| 139 || September 5 || Phillies || 9–8 (11) ||  Diekman (4–4) || Stammen (4–5) || Papelbon (34) || 27,437 || 79–60
|-align="center" bgcolor="ffbbbb"
| 140 || September 6 || Phillies || 3–1 || Burnett (8–15) || Roark (12–10) || Papelbon (35) || 37,408 || 79–61
|-align="center" bgcolor="bbffbb"
| 141 || September 7 || Phillies || 3–2 ||  González (8–9) || Hamels (8–7) || Storen (2) || 29,108 || 80–61
|-align="center" bgcolor="bbffbb"
| 142 || September 8 || Braves || 2–1 ||  Fister (13–6) || Minor (6–10) || Storen (3) || 25,448 || 81–61
|-align="center" bgcolor="bbffbb"
| 143 || September 9 || Braves || 6–4 ||  Zimmermann (11–5) || Santana (14–8) || Storen (4) || 29,233 || 82–61
|-align="center" bgcolor="ffbbbb"
| 144 || September 10 || Braves || 6–2 ||  Harang (11–10) || Strasburg (11–11) || || 31,086 || 82–62
|-align="center" bgcolor="bbffbb"
| 145 || September 11 || @ Mets || 6–2 ||  Roark (13–10) || Colón (13–12) || || 21,111 || 83–62
|-align="center" bgcolor="ffbbbb"
| 146 || September 12 || @ Mets || 4–3 ||  Gee (7–7) ||  González (8–10) || Mejía (26) || 25,792 || 83–63
|-align="center" bgcolor="bbffbb"
| 147 || September 13 || @ Mets  || 10–3 ||  Fister (14–6) || Wheeler (10–10) || || 28,849 || 84–63
|-align="center" bgcolor="bbffbb"
| 148 || September 14 || @ Mets || 3–0 ||  Zimmermann (12–5) || Niese (8–11) || Storen (5)  || 31,553 || 85–63
|-align="center" bgcolor="bbffbb"
| 149 || September 15 || @ Braves || 4–2 ||  Strasburg (12–11) || Santana (14–9) || Storen (6) || 18,220  || 86–63
|-align="center" bgcolor="bbffbb"
| 150 || September 16 || @ Braves || 3–0 ||  Roark (14–10) || Harang (11–11) || Storen (7) || 28,175 || 87–63
|-align="center" bgcolor="ffbbbb"
| 151 || September 17 || @ Braves || 3–1 ||  Wood (11–10) || Detwiler (2–3) || Kimbrel (44) || 26,643 || 87–64
|-align="center" bgcolor="bbffbb"
| 152 || September 18 || @ Marlins || 6–2 ||  González (9–10) || Hand (3–8) ||  || 18,010 || 88–64
|-align="center" bgcolor="bbffbb"
| 153 || September 19 || @ Marlins || 3–2 ||  Fister (15–6) || Koehler (9–10) || Storen (8) || 19,815 || 89–64
|-align="center" bgcolor="bbffbb"
| 154 || September 20 || @ Marlins || 3–2 ||  Zimmermann (13–5) || Cosart (13–10) || Storen (9) || 20,983 || 90–64
|-align="center" bgcolor="bbffbb"
| 155 || September 21 || @ Marlins || 2–1 ||  Strasburg (13–11) || Eovaldi (6–13) || Soriano (32) || 22,806 || 91–64
|-align="center" bgcolor="bbffbb"
| 156 || September 23 || Mets || 4–2 ||  Roark (15–10) || Colón (14–13) || Storen (10) || 30,714 || 92–64
|-align="center" bgcolor="bbbbbb"
|–|| September 24 || Mets || colspan=6| Postponed (rain) Rescheduled for September 25 as part of a doubleheader
|-align="center" bgcolor="ffbbbb"
| 157 || September 25 (1) || Mets || 7–4 ||  Torres (8–5) || Clippard (7-4) || Mejía (28) || 28,629 || 92–65
|-align="center" bgcolor="bbffbb"
| 158 || September 25 (2) || Mets || 3–0 ||  González (10–10) || Wheeler (11–11) || Storen (11) || 26,439 || 93–65
|-align="center" bgcolor="bbffbb"
| 159 || September 26 (1) || Marlins || 4–0 ||  Fister (16–6) || Cosart (4–4) || || 27,920 || 94–65
|-align="center" bgcolor="ffbbbb"
| 160 || September 26 (2)|| Marlins || 15–7 || Ramos (7–0) || Hill (0–1) || || 34,190 || 94–66
|-align="center" bgcolor="bbffbb"
| 161 || September 27 || Marlins || 5–1 ||  Strasburg (14–11) || Eovaldi (6–14) || || 37,529 || 95–66
|-align="center" bgcolor="bbffbb"
| 162 || September 28 || Marlins || 1–0 ||  Zimmermann (14–5) || Álvarez (12–7) || || 35,085 || 96–66
|-

Postseason

Postseason game log

|-align="center" bgcolor="ffbbbb"
| 1 || October 3 || Giants || 3–2 ||  Peavy (1–0) || Strasburg (0–1) || Casilla (1) || 44,035 || 0–1
|-align="center" bgcolor="ffbbbb"
| 2 || October 4 || Giants || 2–1 (18) ||  Petit (1–0) || Roark (0–1) || Strickland (1) || 44,035 || 0–2
|-align="center" bgcolor="bbffbb"
| 3 || October 6 || @ Giants || 4–1 ||  Fister (1–0) || Bumgarner (0–1) || || 43,627 || 1–2
|-align="center" bgcolor="ffbbbb"
| 4 || October 7 || @ Giants || 3–2 ||  Strickland (1–0) || Thornton (0–1) || Casilla (2) || 43,464 || 1–3
|-

Division Series

Game 1, October 3
3:07 p.m. (EDT) at Nationals Park in Washington, D.C.

Game 2, October 4
5:37 p.m. (EDT) at Nationals Park in Washington, D.C.

Game Two of the Division Series between the Nationals and the San Francisco Giants at Nationals Park on October 4 lasted 18 innings before Brandon Belt's solo homer in the top of the 18th gave the Giants a 2-1 victory. It was the longest postseason game in Major League Baseball history by time, lasting 6 hours 23 minutes, and tied the postseason record for number of innings played. It was also the longest game in Nationals history both in terms of number of innings and time elapsed, in both cases breaking Nationals records set during the 2014 regular season.

Game 3, October 6
5:07 p.m. (EDT) at AT&T Park in San Francisco

Game 4, October 7
9:07 p.m. (EDT) at AT&T Park in San Francisco

Roster

Statistics

Regular season

Batting
Table is sortable.

Note: POS = Position; G = Games played; AB = At bats; R = Runs scored; H = Hits; 2B = Doubles; 3B = Triples; HR = Home runs; RBI = Runs batted in; AVG = Batting average; SB = Stolen bases

Complete regular-season offensive statistics are available here.

*Player played for multiple teams; batting statistics reflect time on Nationals only.

Pitching

Note: Pos = Position; W = Wins; L = Losses; ERA = Earned run average; G = Games pitched; GS = Games started; SV = Saves; IP = Innings pitched; R = Runs allowed; ER = Earned runs allowed; BB = Walks allowed; K = Strikeouts

Complete regular-season pitching statistics are available here.

*Player played for multiple teams; pitching statistics reflect time on Nationals only.

Team leaders

Qualifying players only.

Batting

Rendons runs scored total was the highest for any individual player in the National League during the regular season. Spans hit total set a new single-season Washington Nationals record.

Pitching

Postseason

Batting

Table is sortable.

Note: POS = Position; G = Games played; AB = At bats; R = Runs scored; H = Hits; 2B = Doubles; 3B = Triples; HR = Home runs; RBI = Runs batted in; AVG = Batting average; SB = Stolen bases

Complete postseason offensive statistics are available here.

Pitching

Table is sortable.

Note: Pos = Position; W = Wins; L = Losses; ERA = Earned run average; G = Games pitched; GS = Games started; SV = Saves; IP = Innings pitched; R = Runs allowed; ER = Earned runs allowed; BB = Walks allowed; K = Strikeouts

Complete postseason pitching statistics are available here.

Awards and honors

All-Stars
 Jordan Zimmermann, P
 Tyler Clippard, P

Both Zimmermann and Clippard were selected as all-stars for the second time. Zimmermann did not appear in the 2014 Major League Baseball All-Star Game due to injury.

Annual awards

Manager of the Year
 National League Manager of the Year: Matt Williams

Matt Williams became only the fourth Major League baseball manager to win the Manager of the Year award in his first season as a manager, joining Houston's Hal Lanier, who won in 1986, San Francisco's Dusty Baker, who won in 1993, and Florida's Joe Girardi, who won in 2006.

Williams also became the second Washington Nationals manager to win the award, as well as the second to do so in three years, Davey Johnson having won in 2012. Williams was the fourth manager to win the award in franchise history, two managers – Buck Rodgers in 1987 and Felipe Alou in 1994 – having won it while the franchise played as the Montreal Expos.

Silver Slugger
 Ian Desmond, SS
 Anthony Rendon, 3B

During 2014, Ian Desmond became the fourth shortstop in Major League Baseball history to have at least 20 home runs and at least 20 stolen bases in three separate seasons. He won his third consecutive Silver Slugger Award, becoming the first player in Washington Nationals history to win the Silver Slugger Award in three different seasons, exceeding the previous record of two set by third baseman Ryan Zimmermann in 2009 and 2010. He became the fifth Major League Baseball shortstop in win the Silver Slugger in three consecutive seasons, the first to do so since Derek Jeter won four in a row from 2006 to 2009 with the New York Yankees, and the first shortstop in the National League to win three in a row since Barry Larkin won five in a row with the Cincinnati Reds from 1988 through 1992.

Anthony Rendon won the Silver Slugger Award in his first full major league season. In 2014, he tied with Casey McGehee of the Miami Marlins to lead all National League third basemen with a .287 batting average and led the National League with 111 runs scored.

Desmond and Rendon became the first shortstop-third baseman duo to win the Silver Slugger Award in the same season since Alex Rodriguez and Derek Jeter did it with the New York Yankees in 2008.

Tony Conigliaro Award

 Tony Conigliaro Award: Wilson Ramos

Wilson Ramos received the 2014 Tony Conigliaro Award, which is given for demonstrating spirit, determination, and courage. He received it for his performance in 2014 after overcoming his kidnapping in Venezuela in 2011 and various injuries in the following years. He was the first player in Washington Nationals history and the third player in franchise history to win the award.

Farm system

LEAGUE CHAMPIONS: Potomac

References

External links

 2014 Washington Nationals Season official site 
 2014 Washington Nationals season at Baseball-Reference

Washington Nationals seasons
Washington Nationals
National League East champion seasons
Washington Nationals